Darrian Miller (born April 8, 1993) is an American football offensive tackle who is currently a free agent. He played college football at Kentucky.

High school career
Miller was born in Irvine, California and attended Bryan Station High School in Lexington, Kentucky where, as a junior he was named to the Second-team all-state team as a junior by The Associated Press. As a senior, he was included on the "Class of the Commonwealth" list of top-22 seniors in the state of Kentucky by the Lexington Herald-Leader. He also was named Second-team All-State by the Louisville Courier-Journal.

He was ranked by Scout.com as one of the nations' top 20 offensive tackles. He was also ranked one of the top 125 players nationally. In his high school career, he played left tackle, left guard and defensive end. He was also a two-year member of the all-city team. He also played in two all-star games, the Kentucky vs. Tennessee Border Bowl and the Kentucky East-West Game.

College career
At Kentucky, Miller, a biology major, started his career as a tight end before switching to offensive tackle where he played in 12 games and started against Central Michigan and Louisville. As a sophomore and junior, he started all 12 games each season. Miller as suspended for Kentucky's season opener due to a violation of team rules.

As an offensive tackle he started 35 of his 47 games played at Kentucky.

Professional career
After going undrafted in the 2015 NFL draft Miller signed a 4-year $1.58 million contract with the Cleveland Browns. On September 5, he was waived during final cuts. He was signed to the teams practice squad the next day. On November 10, 2015, Miller was promoted to the Browns active roster. On December 5, he was waived by the Browns. On December 8, he was re-signed by the Browns.

Personal life
Miller's the son of Robert and Armida Miller. His sisters are Jacqueline and Andrea Miller.

References

External links
 Official Twitter
 Kentucky Wildcats bio
 Cleveland Browns bio

Living people
1993 births
Sportspeople from Irvine, California
Players of American football from California
American football tight ends
American football offensive tackles
Kentucky Wildcats football players
Cleveland Browns players
Players of American football from Lexington, Kentucky